Xaisomboun  may refer to:

 Special Zone of Xaisomboun, was a special zone of Laos dissolved in 2006.
 Xaisomboun Province, is a new province of Laos since 2014.